Antoni Melchior Fijałkowski ( Pszczew, near Poznań, 3 January 1778 – 5 October 1861, Warsaw) was the Archbishop Metropolitan of Warsaw and spiritual leader of the nation during the Partitions of Poland.

References

See also
List of Poles

1778 births
1861 deaths
19th-century Roman Catholic archbishops in Poland
Archbishops of Warsaw
Bishops of Płock
November Uprising participants
Clergy from Poznań
Canons of Włocławek
Burials at St. John's Archcathedral, Warsaw